Durgapur Steel Plant is one of the integrated steel plants of Steel Authority of India Limited, located in Durgapur, in the eastern Indian state of West Bengal. It was set up with the help of United Kingdom.

Product mix Tonnes/annum 
 Merchant Products         280,000 
 Structural                       207,000  
 Skelp                            180,000 
 Wheels & Axles              58,000 
 Semis                           861,000
 Total Salable steel                  1,586,000

Forged wheels are especially made here; in October 2010, DSP licensed technology from the Ukrainian manufacturer Interpipe which would allow it to make 955mm monobloc wheels.

Location 
DSP is situated about 158 km from Kolkata, its geographical location is defined as 23° 27' North and 88° 29' East. It is situated on the banks of the Damodar River in the Paschim Bardhaman district in the growing industrial city of Durgapur. The Grand Trunk Road and the main Kolkata-Delhi railway line pass through Durgapur.

See also 
 Steel Authority of India Limited

References

External links 
 

Steel plants of India
Steel Authority of India
Economy of West Bengal
Buildings and structures in Durgapur, West Bengal
1960 establishments in West Bengal